The military Order of Vittorio Veneto was an Italian order of chivalry that was founded as national order by the fifth President of the Italian Republic, Giuseppe Saragat, in 1968, "to express the gratitude of the nation" to those decorated with the Medal and the War Cross of Military Valor (Medaglia e Croce di Guerra al Valor Militare) who had fought for at least six months in World War I and earlier conflicts.

The Order is awarded in the single degree of Knight.

Being awarded more than 50 years after the War, most of the recipients were retired from employment. For the Knights who did not enjoy an income above their tax allowance, a small annuity was granted in favor of those recipients, payable to the widow or minor children on death. The allowance was also granted to those that fought in the former Austro-Hungarian armed forces who became Italian citizens after annexation.

The order was bestowed by decree of the President of the Italian Republic, its head, on the recommendation of the Minister of Defence.
A Lieutenant General chaired the council, which investigated applications made by eligible parties to the municipality of residence. With the death of the last surviving Knights of Vittorio Veneto in 2008, the order fell into abeyance and, in 2008, it was formally wound-up by repeal of the original legislation.
It was revived anyway on 15 March 2010 in spite of being still abeyant.

See also 
 List of Italian orders of knighthood
 Military Order of Italy

References

External links 
 Presidenza della Repubblica - Le Onorificenze 

Vittorio Veneto, Order of
Vittorio Veneto, Order of
1968 establishments in Italy
Military awards and decorations of World War I